The Thida Grove School is a historic school building in the rural community of Thida in southern Independence County, Arkansas.  Located on the north side of County Road 20, it is a single-story vernacular wood-frame structure, with a side gable roof, weatherboard siding, and a concrete foundation.  It has a recessed porch with a pair of entrances.  The interior has a single large chamber, with tongue-and-groove wainscoting and wide oak flooring.  The school was built about 1920 during a boom period in the region.

The building was listed on the National Register of Historic Places in 1992.

See also
National Register of Historic Places listings in Independence County, Arkansas

References

School buildings on the National Register of Historic Places in Arkansas
National Register of Historic Places in Independence County, Arkansas
Schools in Independence County, Arkansas
School buildings completed in 1920
1920 establishments in Arkansas